Kooper is a surname. Notable people with the surname include:

Al Kooper (born 1944), American songwriter, record producer and musician
Kees Kooper (1923–2014), Dutch violinist
Markus Kooper (1918–2005), Namibian activist, educator and religious figure
Simon Kooper (before 1860–1913), Captain of the ǃKharakhoen (Fransman Nama), a subtribe of the Nama people in Namibia

See also
 Cooper (disambiguation)

Surnames